Zoltán Bötji is a Hungarian sprint canoer who competed in the late 1980s. He won two medals in the K-4 10000 m event at the ICF Canoe Sprint World Championships with a gold in 1985 and a silver in 1987.

References

Hungarian male canoeists
Living people
Year of birth missing (living people)
ICF Canoe Sprint World Championships medalists in kayak
20th-century Hungarian people